Sergei Alexandrovich Chetverukhin (born 12 January 1946) is a former Soviet figure skater. He is the 1972 Olympic silver medalist, a three-time World medalist, and a four-time European medalist.

Personal life 
Chetverukhin was born on 12 January 1946 in Moscow, Soviet Union. He moved to Canada in 1990 at the invitation of Canadian figure skater Donald Jackson. He holds Russian and Canadian citizenship. He is married and has a daughter.

Career 
Chetverukhin trained at VSS Trud in Moscow. He was coached by Tatyana Tolmacheva and later by Stanislav Zhuk.

Chetverukhin began appearing at major international events in 1965 and won his first Soviet national title in the 1966–67 season. The following season, he repeated as the national champion and also took gold at the 1968 Winter Universiade in Innsbruck, ahead of Marián Filc of Czechoslovakia. He finished 5th at the 1968 European Championships in Västerås, Sweden; 9th at the 1968 Winter Olympics in Grenoble, France; and 9th at the 1968 World Championships in Geneva, Switzerland.

Chetverukhin's first ISU Championship medal, bronze, came at the 1969 Europeans in Garmisch-Partenkirchen, West Germany. The following year, he finished just off the podium at the continental event.

Chetverukhin was awarded medals at both ISU Championships in the 1970–71 season. After winning silver at the 1971 European Championships in Zurich, where he finished second to Czechoslovakia's Ondrej Nepela, he received bronze at the 1971 World Championships in Lyon, France, behind Nepela and France's Patrick Péra.

The following season, he won silver at  the 1972 European Championships in Gothenburg, Sweden; 1972 Winter Olympics in Sapporo, Japan; and 1972 World Championships in Calgary, Alberta, Canada. Each time he finished second to Nepela. At the Olympics, Chetverukhin was third in the compulsory figures and first in the free skate.

In his final competitive season, Chetverukhin received silver medals at the 1973 European Championships in Cologne, West Germany, and the 1973 World Championships in Bratislava, Czechoslovakia. At both events he placed second to Nepela.

Chetverukhin worked as a skating coach in Montreal before relocating to Toronto.

Results

References

1946 births
Living people
Figure skaters from Moscow
Soviet male single skaters
Figure skaters at the 1972 Winter Olympics
Olympic figure skaters of the Soviet Union
Olympic silver medalists for the Soviet Union
Russian figure skating coaches
Honoured Masters of Sport of the USSR
Olympic medalists in figure skating
World Figure Skating Championships medalists
European Figure Skating Championships medalists
Medalists at the 1972 Winter Olympics
Universiade medalists in figure skating
Universiade gold medalists for the Soviet Union
Universiade silver medalists for the Soviet Union
Competitors at the 1966 Winter Universiade
Competitors at the 1968 Winter Universiade
Competitors at the 1970 Winter Universiade
Soviet emigrants to Canada